Kostrzyn  is a village in the administrative district of Gmina Wyśmierzyce, within Białobrzegi County, Masovian Voivodeship, in east-central Poland.

The village has a population of 300.

History
Kostrzyn was a private village of Polish nobility, administratively located in the Radom County in the Sandomierz Voivodeship in the Lesser Poland Province. In 1827, the village had a population of 85.

References

Kostrzyn